Fiorentina competed in Serie A, Coppa Italia and Inter-Cities Fairs Cup.

Summary
Coached by Pesaola, Fiorentina won their second Scudetto in the 1968/69 season by prevailing over the favored Milan and Cagliari. ; led by Chiarugi's runs, Maraschi's goals (14) and De Sisti's class.

Squad

(captain)

Competitions

Serie A

League table

Matches

Coppa Italia

Inter-Cities Fairs Cup

References

ACF Fiorentina seasons
Fiorentina
Italian football championship-winning seasons